Noel Torpey (born December 12, 1971) is an American politician who served in the Missouri House of Representatives from 2011 to 2014.

References

1971 births
Living people
Republican Party members of the Missouri House of Representatives